Heterodera latipons, the Mediterranean cereal cyst nematode or wheat cyst nematode, is a plant pathogenic nematode.

See also 
 List of barley diseases
 List of oat diseases

References

External links 
 Nemaplex, University of California - Heterodera latipons

latipons
Plant pathogenic nematodes
Barley diseases
Oats diseases